Stirk is a surname of Norse origin. Notable people with the surname include:

Cornelius Stirk, fictional character
Sarah Stirk, British television presenter

See also
Cattle#Terminology, a stirk is a yearling calf